This article contains the discography of Japanese punk/rock singer Hitomi Takahashi.

Discography

Albums

Singles

Featured/Collaborative Releases

References 

Discographies of Japanese artists
Punk rock discographies